Leicester Rowing Club is a rowing and sculling club in Leicester. The club was formed in 1882 and represents the City of Leicester in Regatta and Head Races around Great Britain and Worldwide.  The club insignia is based on the mythical Wyvern and rowers compete in the club's colours of black and white.

History

Facilities 
The club has a custom build boathouse part funded by money provided by the UK Lottery, which is also houses the fleet of De Montfort University Rowing Club and University of Leicester Boat Club.

Leicester Regatta and racing
The Leicester Regatta is held annually at the start of the regatta season. The event is known in the rowing community as the "Henley of the East Midlands". The Club competes at Head Races and Regattas all year round.

Club Kit 
Leicester Rowing club race in black and white colours with pure white blades.

Honours

National champions

References

Rowing clubs in England
Sport in Leicester
Sports clubs established in 1882
1882 establishments in England